Scott Foster may refer to:

 Scott Michael Foster (born 1985), American actor
 Scott Foster (ice hockey) (born 1982), Canadian ice hockey goaltender
 Scott Foster (basketball) NBA referee